Indonesia–Liberia relations was officially established in 1965; however, it was not until 2013 that the bilateral relations between Indonesia and Liberia started to intensify, signed with the visits of two respective countries' leaders. Indonesian embassy in Abuja is also accredited to Liberia, while Liberian embassy in New Delhi is also accredited to Indonesia.

History
The relations was pioneered by the participation of Liberian delegation during Asia-Africa Conference in Bandung back in 1955. The bilateral relations was officially established in 1965. After then the bilateral relations seems to be neglected, until 2013, when Indonesian President Susilo Bambang Yudhoyono visited Monrovia on January 31 to February 2, 2013. Reciprocated by the state visit paid by Liberian President Ellen Johnson Sirleaf to Indonesia on March 24–27, 2013. Other than visited Jakarta to strengthen bilateral relations, the Liberian President also visited Bali to attend the Fourth Session of the United Nations High Level Panel of Eminent Persons on the Post-2015 Development Agenda. These are the first visits of both countries leaders to each counterparts'.

Cooperations
The cooperation is focussed on development programs, especially through MDGs. Indonesia has agreed to assist Liberia through technical cooperation and capacity building in various sectors, especially in industry, agriculture, fishery, education and human resource development. Both nations also has agreed to increase the trade promotion, and also technical supports to increase rice productivity in Liberia.

Trade
The bilateral trade volume between Indonesia and Liberia recorded a significant increase, from US$30.9 million in 2011 to 39.5 million in 2012.

Notes

 
Liberia
Bilateral relations of Liberia